Mylene or Mylène is a given name, a contraction of Marie-Hélène. Notable people and characters with the name include:

 Mylène Demongeot (bprn 1936), French actress
 Mylene Dizon, Filipino actress and model
 Mylène Farmer, French singer-songwriter
 Mylène Jampanoï (born 1980), French actress
 Mylene Flare Jenius, fictional character in the Macross universe
 Mylène Lamoureux, Canadian ice-dancer
 Mylene Ong (born 1991), Singaporean Olympic swimmer
 Mylene Paat (born 1994), Filipino volleyball player

See also 
 Myleene Klass, British entertainment personality

French feminine given names